The State Corporation Commission, or SCC, is a Virginia (USA) regulatory agency whose authority encompasses utilities, insurance, state-chartered financial institutions, securities, retail franchising, and railroads. It is the state's central filing office for corporations, limited partnerships, limited liability companies and Uniform Commercial Code liens.

Mission
The State Corporation Commission strives to apply law and regulation to balance the interests of citizens, businesses, and customers in regulating Virginia's business and economic concerns and works continually to improve the regulatory and administrative processes.

Objectives
Fulfill the duties prescribed by the Virginia Constitution and the law enacted by the General Assembly of Virginia fully and to the best of its ability;
Ensure that all parties and persons who appear before the Commission receive due process of law; 
Provide reliable information and assistance to Virginians in a consistent and high-quality fashion; 
Provide assistance to Virginians who have valid disputes with regulated companies; and 
Adopt rules and regulations that keep pace with legislative, business, economic, social and technological changes.

Activities
Examples of SCC activities include: 

Serving as the central filing office for business entities authorized to transact business in Virginia and for UCC financing statements;
Providing licensing, regulation, examination, and investigation of insurance companies, agencies and agents;
Regulating securities, brokers, investment advisers and registering franchises and trademarks;
Regulating Virginia's investor-owned electric, natural gas, water and sewer utilities, and member-owned electric cooperatives;
Providing oversight for Virginia's telecommunication industry;
Providing accounting and financial information for the deliberation of utility cases;
Assessing the property of public service corporations for local taxation, collecting various taxes and fees, and obtaining annual reports;
Conducting research and developing special studies and forecasts related to economic and financial issues of public utilities; 
Approving rate increases for landline telephone companies, utilities, etc. and approving rate restructuring plans;
Administering safety programs involving underground utility damage prevention, jurisdictional natural gas and hazardous liquid pipeline facilities, and railroads;
Protecting consumers through the administration of state laws regarding depository and non-depository financial institutions; and 
Handling and investigating complaints that are energy, telephone, financial, insurance, securities or retail franchising related.

The State Corporation Commission's structure is unique in that it is organized as a separate department of government with delegated administrative, legislative, and judicial powers. The SCC's membership, powers, duties, and procedures are set out in Article IX of the Constitution of Virginia. Section 4 of that Article allows parties aggrieved by the SCC's decisions to appeal to the Virginia Supreme Court.

Consumer education

Virginia Energy Sense
Virginia Energy Sense is the Commonwealth of Virginia's statewide consumer education and outreach program under the guidance of the SCC to encourage electric energy efficiency and conservation in Virginia households, businesses, and institutions.
In 2008, the General Assembly of Virginia directed the SCC to develop and implement an electric energy consumer education program to provide retail customers with information regarding energy conservation, energy efficiency, demand-side management, demand response, and renewable energy.

The goal is for Virginians to reduce electricity consumption by 10% below 2006 levels by 2022.

Office of the Managed Care Ombudsman
The Office of the Managed Care Ombudsman was created in 1999, enacted by the General Assembly of Virginia and signed into legislation by then-Governor Jim Gilmore. This office is within the SCC's Bureau of Insurance.

The principal function of the Managed Care Ombudsman is to help Virginia consumers who have health care insurance provided by a Managed Care Health Insurance Plan (MCHIP), such as a Health Maintenance Organization or Preferred Provider Organization. The Managed Care Ombudsman can assist consumers in understanding and exercising their rights of appeal of adverse decisions made by MCHIPs.

The Managed Care Ombudsman answers inquiries about MCHIPs and managed care, and helps individuals who experience problems. The Ombudsman also assists individuals in understanding how managed care functions and provides information on the types of MCHIPs available in Virginia. The Ombudsman cannot  investigate or resolve complaints, but can refer individuals who have a complaint to the internal review mechanisms at the MCHIP or to the appropriate government agency.

C.A.R.E. program
Established by the SCC's Division of Utility and Railroad Safety, the C.A.R.E. program is made up of education plans and training modules relative to the Underground Utility Damage Prevention Act, and the Commission Rules for Enforcement of the Act. A statewide Education Executive Committee, with seven members representing excavators, utility operators, locators, the notification center and SCC staff, meet yearly to review the results of the education efforts and recommends an education and training plan for the next year. Education plans have included brand marketing, general outreach and training workshops.

Investor Education program
The SCC's Division of Securities & Retail Franchising provides Virginians with the investor information needed to make appropriate decisions for their financial future, as well as to avoid investment fraud. This division provides free content associated with the Investor Education program in the form of publications, brochures, and teaching guides, including general outreach and presentations.

History
The Virginia Constitution of 1902 created the SCC to replace the Virginia Board of Public Works and the Office of Railroad Commissioner. The three-member Commission was charged with regulating the state railroads and telephone and telegraph companies and with registering corporations in Virginia. The SCC began operations on March 2, 1903. Since then, the Virginia General Assembly has broadened the SCC's regulatory authority.

The 1902 Constitution vested the SCC with three forms of power—judicial, legislative, and executive. The SCC acts as a court of record and holds formal hearings when warranted. It can enforce its orders by fines or contempt citations. There is a right of appeal to the Virginia Supreme Court from any SCC decision. The SCC's executive authority is exercised in its day-to-day administration. Its legislative authority is exercised when it makes rules or sets rates.

Composition
The SCC is composed of three commissioners, each of whom is appointed by a joint vote of both houses of the Virginia Legislature. No person shall be eligible to serve as a member of the Commission unless at the time of his election or appointment he is a qualified voter under Virginia law. However, at least one member of the commission must, at any given time, meet the requirements set forth for judges of a Virginia court of record. The commissioners serve six year terms, and their appointment is staggered, so that a new appointment or reappointment vote occurs every two years.

Past and present members
Beverley T. Crump (1903–1907)
Henry C. Stuart (1903–1908)
Henry Fairfax (1903–1905)
Joseph E. Willard (1905–1910)
Robert R. Prentis (1907–1916)
William F. Rhea (1908–1925)
J.R. Wingfield (1910–1918)
C.B. Garnett (1910–1918)
Alexander Forward (1918–1923)
Robert E. Williams (1918–1919)
S.L. Lupton (1918–1919)
Berkley D. Adams (1919–1928)
Oscar L. Shewmake (1923–1924)
H. Lester Hooker (1924–1972)
Louis S. Epes (1925–1929)
William Meade Fletcher (1928–1943)
George C. Peery (1929–1933)
Thomas W. Ozlin (1933–1944)
Harvey B. Apperson (1944–1947)
Robert O. Norris (1944–1944)
L. McCarthy Downs (1944–1949)
W. Marshall King (1947–1957)
Ralph T. Catterall (1949–1973)
Jesse W. Dillon (1957–1972)
Preston C. Shannon (1972–1996)
Junie L. Bradshaw (1972–1985)
Thomas P. Harwood, Jr. (1973–1992)
Elizabeth B. Lacy (1985–1988)
Theodore V. Morrison, Jr. (1989–2007)
Hullihen Williams Moore (1992–2004)
Clinton Miller (1996–2006)
Mark Christie (2004–2021)
Judith Williams Jagdmann (2006–)
James C. Dimitri (2008–2018)
Patricia L. West (2019–2020)
Jehmal T. Hudson (2020–present)
Angela L. Navarro (2021–2022)

See also
List of company registers
 Public Utilities Commission

References

External links
State Corporation Commission official website
Virginia Energy Sense official website

State agencies of Virginia
1903 establishments in Virginia
Virginia
Virginia
Registrars of companies